TWHS may refer to:
 The Woodlands High School, The Woodlands, Texas, United States
 Thomas Worthington High School, Worthington, Ohio, United States
 Tri-West Hendricks High School, Lizton, Indiana, United States
 Tulare Western High School, Tulare, California, United States

See also 
 TWH (disambiguation)